Christ The King Preparatory School, later known as Cristo Rey Newark High School, is a private, Roman Catholic high school in Newark, New Jersey.  The school opened in the 2007 school year with an initial freshman class of 100 students, and operates within the Roman Catholic Archdiocese of Newark.

As of the 2019–20 school year, the school had an enrollment of 210 students and 16.6 classroom teachers (on an FTE basis), for a student–teacher ratio of 12.7:1. The school's student body was 45.7% (96) Black, 45.7% (96) Hispanic, 4.8% (10) two or more races, 1.9% (4) Native Hawaiian/ Pacific Islander, 1.4% (3) Asian and 0.5% (1) White.

On May 7, 2020, the Archdiocese of Newark stated that the school would permanently close at the end of the academic year.

Background
The school operates on the site of the now-defunct Our Lady of Good Counsel High School, which closed in June 2006.

Christ The King Preparatory School opened in August 2007 and graduated its first class in 2011.  It is part of the Cristo Rey Network of high schools nationwide, the original being Cristo Rey Jesuit High School in Chicago. The president of Christ the King Prep is Fr. Bob Sandoz.  Its founding principal is Kevin P. Cuddihy, the former principal of St. Peter's Preparatory School in Jersey City and former dean of students at Xavier High School in Manhattan.

For the 2016–17 school year, the cost per student was $12,835, which is defrayed through a $7,100 corporate internship and $2,700 in financial assistance provided to all students; the net tuition was $2,700 per student.

Students must complete 40 hours of voluntary service in each of the first two years and 50 hours of service in both junior and senior years. Various retreat opportunities are offered and all make a retreat in junior year.

Student ambassadors are selected to represent the school to the public, and there is an elected student council.

On May 7, 2020, Archdiocese revealed that "Cristo Rey Newark High School, a member of the Cristo Rey Network®, also will close due to lack of operational viability, as per a resolution adopted by the school’s Board."

Athletics
The Christ the King Knights compete in the Super Essex Conference, following a reorganization of sports leagues in Northern New Jersey by the New Jersey State Interscholastic Athletic Association (NJSIAA).

Sports offered include:

Boys: 
Basketball,
baseball (pending)

Girls:
Volleyball,
softball,
cheerleading, and 
basketball

Co-Ed:
Bowling,
soccer,
track & field,
cross country,
golf, and 
swimming (pending)

References

Further reading
 Kearney, G. R. More Than a Dream: The Cristo Rey Story: How One School's Vision Is Changing the World. Chicago, Ill: Loyola Press, 2008.

External links
 School website
Cristo Rey Network
 Fr. John P. Foley honored with Presidential Citizen's Medal
60 minutes
Cristo Rey Featured in WashPost column by George Will
 Boston Globe - With sense of purpose, students cut class for a day 
 Bill & Melinda Gates Foundation - Success of Innovative Urban Catholic School Sparks Major Investment

2007 establishments in New Jersey
Cristo Rey Network
Educational institutions established in 2007
High schools in Newark, New Jersey
Private high schools in Essex County, New Jersey
Roman Catholic Archdiocese of Newark
Catholic secondary schools in New Jersey
Poverty-related organizations